The Swinging Belles are a Canadian children's music group from St. John's, Newfoundland and Labrador. The band, who perform in a swing jazz style, consists of vocalists Laura Winter and Erin Power, and guitarist Duane Andrews. Winter and Power are both schoolteachers who also perform country music with The Dilettantes, and Andrews is Power's husband. Power is also the sister of musician and broadcaster Tom Power.

History

The band's debut album, More Sheep, Less Sleep, won both the Canadian Folk Music Award for children's album of the year at the 11th Canadian Folk Music Awards, and the Juno Award for Children's Album of the Year at the Juno Awards of 2016.

In 2017 the band performed at the Harbourfront Theatre in Summerside, PEI, and released Jingle Belles, an album of Christmas music.

In 2018 The Swinging Belles performed at a festival in Normandy, France, as well as at the Stan Rogers Music Festival in Canso, Nova Scotia.  That year the group released the album The Superstar Sibling Detective Agency, and were named Entertainer of the Year at the Music Newfoundland Awards.

References

Canadian children's musical groups
Canadian jazz ensembles
Musical groups from St. John's, Newfoundland and Labrador
Swing revival ensembles
Juno Award for Children's Album of the Year winners
Canadian Folk Music Award winners